Below are the squads for the 1997 Bandy World Championship final tournament in Sweden.

Group A

Finland

Kazakhstan

Norway

Russia

Sweden
Coach: Stefan Karlsson

References

Bandy World Championship squads